John Pekkanen (born February 11, 1939, in Lyme, Connecticut) is an author, and two-time National Magazine Award-winning American journalist and the winner of ten other national journalism awards including the National Headliner Award, the Penney-Missouri Award for medical journalism, and the Award of Excellence from the American College of Emergency Physicians.

A former correspondent and bureau chief for Life magazine and a senior writer for Washingtonian, Pekkanen has written for The New Republic, The Atlantic Monthly, Town and Country and is the author of Donor: How One Girl's Death Gave Life to Others; The Best Doctors in the U.S.; Victims: An Account of a Rape; The American Connection - Profiteering and Politicking in the "Ethical" Drug Industry; M. D.: Doctors Talk about Themselves; and My Father, My Son with Admiral Elmo Zumwalt and Lieutenant Elmo Zumwalt. He is also a published poet.

Pekkanen has been a Nieman Fellow at Harvard University. He lives in the Washington, D.C. area.

References

External links 
 John Pekkanen at Washingtonian.com
 Nieman Fellow Alumni

1939 births
Living people
People from Lyme, Connecticut
American people of Finnish descent
American male journalists
Nieman Fellows
20th-century American journalists